Borna Ćorić was the defending champion, but retired from his quarterfinal match against Pierre-Hugues Herbert.

Roger Federer won a record-extending tenth singles title in Halle, defeating David Goffin in the final, 7–6(7–2), 6–1.

Seeds

Draw

Finals

Top half

Bottom half

Qualifying

Seeds

Qualifiers

Lucky loser
  Miomir Kecmanović

Qualifying draw

First qualifier

Second qualifier

Third qualifier

Fourth qualifier

References

 Main draw
 Qualifying draw

2019 Halle Open